Stilli is a former municipality of the canton of Aargau, Switzerland. On 1 January 2006, it merged with its neighbouring municipality, Villigen.

Economy
 there was a total of 200 workers who lived in the municipality.  Of these, 173 or about 86.5% of the residents worked outside Stilli while 23 people commuted into the municipality for work.  There were a total of 50 jobs (of at least 6 hours per week) in the municipality.

References

External links
 Official website 
 

Villages in Switzerland
Former municipalities of Aargau